Mare nostro may refer to:
 Mare nostro (opera), 1985
 Mare Nostrum, a Roman term for the Mediterranean Sea and a term in Fascist Italy

See also 
 Mare Nostrum (disambiguation)